Parastesilea scutellaris is a species of beetle in the family Cerambycidae. It was described by Francis Polkinghorne Pascoe in 1865, originally under the genus Stesilea. It is known from Sulawesi.

References

Pteropliini
Beetles described in 1865